Magnolia sieboldii, or Siebold's magnolia, also known as Korean mountain magnolia and Oyama magnolia, is a species of Magnolia native to east Asia in China, Japan, and Korea. It is named after the German doctor Philipp Franz von Siebold (1796–1866).

Description
The stalks, young leaves, young twigs and young buds are downy. The leaves are elliptical to ovate-oblong, 9–16 cm (rarely 25 cm) long and 4–10 cm (rarely 12 cm) broad, with a 1.5-4.5 cm petiole.

The flowers, unlike the spring flowering magnolias, open primarily in the early summer, but continue intermittently until late summer. They are pendulous, cup-shaped, 7–10 cm diameter, and have 6-12 tepals, the outer three smaller, the rest larger, and pure white; the carpels are greenish and the stamens reddish-purple or greenish-white.

Subspecies
There are three subspecies:
Magnolia sieboldii subsp. japonica. Japan. Low shrub; flowers with 6 tepals and greenish-white stamens.
Magnolia sieboldii subsp. sieboldii. Japan, Korea, eastern China. Tree or large shrub; flowers with 9-12 tepals and reddish-purple stamens; leaves smaller, rarely over 16 cm.
Magnolia sieboldii subsp. sinensis. Southwestern China (Sichuan); flowers as subsp. sieboldii; leaves larger, commonly to 22 cm.

Cultivation
Magnolia sieboldii is grown as an ornamental tree in gardens. It is one of the hardiest magnolias, successful in cultivation as far north as Arboretum Mustila in Finland. The cultivar 'Colossus' has gained the Royal Horticultural Society's Award of Garden Merit.

Called mongnan or mokran (목란/), Siebold's magnolia is the national flower of North Korea.

References

Hunt, D. (ed). (1998). Magnolias and their allies. International Dendrology Society and Magnolia Society. 
Flora of China: Magnoliaceae (draft account)

External links
 
 Friedman, William (Ned). "Oyama magnolia in full bloom." Posts from the Collections, Arnold Arboretum of Harvard University website, June 12, 2016. Accessed 1 October 2019.
 Magnolia sieboldii images at the Arnold Arboretum of Harvard University Plant Image Database.

sieboldii
Flora of China
Flora of Eastern Asia
Trees of China
Trees of Japan
Trees of Korea
National symbols of North Korea
Garden plants of Asia
Ornamental trees